Isochariesthes is a genus of longhorn beetles of the subfamily Lamiinae, containing the following species:

 Isochariesthes arrowi (Breuning, 1934)
 Isochariesthes braini (Breuning, 1981)
 Isochariesthes breuningi (Gilmour, 1954)
 Isochariesthes breuningstefi (Teocchi, 1985)
 Isochariesthes brunneomaculata (Breuning, 1977)
 Isochariesthes brunneopunctipennis (Hunt & Breuning, 1966)
 Isochariesthes ciferrii (Breuning, 1940)
 Isochariesthes epupaensis Adlbauer, 2002
 Isochariesthes euchroma (Breuning, 1970)
 Isochariesthes euchromoides (Breuning, 1981)
 Isochariesthes eurychroma (Téocchi, 1990)
 Isochariesthes flava (Fiedler, 1939)
 Isochariesthes flavescens (Breuning, 1959)
 Isochariesthes flavoguttata (Aurivillius, 1913)
 Isochariesthes francoisi (Breuning, 1972)
 Isochariesthes fulvoplagiatoides (Breuning, 1959)
 Isochariesthes furva (Fiedler, 1939)
 Isochariesthes fuscocaudata (Fiedler, 1939)
 Isochariesthes grundaeva (Fiedler, 1939)
 Isochariesthes lesnei (Breuning, 1934)
 Isochariesthes ludibunda (Fiedler, 1939)
 Isochariesthes moucheti (Breuning, 1965)
 Isochariesthes multiguttata (Hunt & Breuning, 1955)
 Isochariesthes picta (Breuning, 1938)
 Isochariesthes suturalis (Aurivillius, 1914)
 Isochariesthes transversevitticollis (Breuning, 1955)
 Isochariesthes tricolor (Breuning, 1964)
 Isochariesthes tripunctata (Aurivillius, 1903)
 Isochariesthes ugandicola (Breuning, 1963)
 Isochariesthes undulatovittata (Breuning, 1962)
 Isochariesthes variegata (Breuning, 1939)

References

 
Tragocephalini
Cerambycidae genera